André Fabião Viapiana, also known as André Chu (born 15 March 1981), is a Brazilian footballer who plays for Reggiana.

André Viapiana played for Bragantino, 15 de Novembro, and CRB in 2007, before moving to Swiss club AC Lugano in February 2008.

References

External links
http://www.cbf.com.br/php/registro.php?i=138740
http://aic.football.it/scheda/21848/viapiana-fabiao-anfre.htm

Brazilian footballers
Brazilian expatriate footballers
Clube Atlético Bragantino players
Clube 15 de Novembro players
Clube de Regatas Brasil players
FC Lugano players
A.C. Reggiana 1919 players
Expatriate footballers in Switzerland
Expatriate footballers in Italy
Association football midfielders
Footballers from São Paulo
1981 births
Living people